Matthew William Glennon (born 8 October 1978) is an English former professional footballer who played as a goalkeeper.

A graduate of the Bolton Wanderers Academy, he spent 1997 to 2001 at the club without making a first team appearance. Instead he spent part of 1999 on loan at Port Vale, and part of 2000 on loan at Stockport County and then Bristol Rovers; he played just one game for Rovers, and never made it onto the pitch for Port Vale or Stockport County.

He did manage to find regular football on loan at Carlisle United in the 2000–01 campaign, before securing a £50,000 move to Hull City in June 2001. He returned to Carlisle on a free transfer in October 2002, and helped the club to win promotion out of the Conference National as winners of the 2005 play-off Final. He then switched to Scottish side Falkirk, before signing with St Johnstone in January 2006, where he managed to score a goal.

Glennon returned to England in June 2006 to play for Huddersfield Town. He spent four years with the club, making over 100 appearances, before he joined Bradford City in January 2010. He moved on to Stockport County in September 2010, and became the first choice keeper from his arrival up until his departure in January 2012. He then joined Chester, and helped the club to win the Northern Premier League title in 2011–12. He signed with FC Halifax Town in July 2012, and helped the club to win promotion out of the Conference North in May 2013. He had a loan spell with Buxton in 2016, and also spent time with Scarborough Athletic, before making his final appearance in football for AFC Emley in February 2017.

Club career

Bolton Wanderers
Born in Stockport, Greater Manchester, Glennon started as a trainee at Bolton Wanderers, but could not break into the first team and after unsuccessful loan spells at First Division clubs Port Vale and Stockport County, he finally made his professional debut on loan at Second Division side Bristol Rovers in a 0–0 draw with Wigan Athletic at the Memorial Stadium on 16 September 2000, and was described as "impressive" after making "important saves from Kevin Nicholls and Simon Haworth". However, he was not picked again by "Pirates" boss Ian Holloway. He joined Third Division side Carlisle United on loan in November 2000. He played 29 games for the "Cumbrians" in the 2000–01 season. In January 2001 he turned down a transfer to Bristol Rovers, that would have been worth around £250,000 for Bolton, saying that he was happy to remain on loan at Ian Atkins's Carlisle.

Hull City
In June 2001, he moved to Hull City after being signed by manager Brian Little for a £50,000 fee to compete with Paul Musselwhite for a first team place. He started the 2001–02 in goal despite struggling with his weight, but was replaced by Musselwhite in the second half of the campaign. Glennon regained the "Tigers" number one spot under Jan Mølby's brief reign as manager, before he was allowed to leave for Roddy Collins's Carlisle United on a free transfer in October 2002 after being deemed surplus to requirements at Boothferry Park by incoming manager Peter Taylor.

Carlisle United
Glennon played for Carlisle at the Millennium Stadium in the 2003 Football League Trophy Final, where they were beaten 2–0 by Bristol City. He played a total of 52 games in the 2002–03 season as Carlisle avoided relegation by a one-point margin. He then featured 49 times in the 2003–04 campaign as Carlisle were relegated into the Conference. Manager Paul Simpson guided United to promotion at the first attempt as play-off winners in 2005 with a 1–0 win over Stevenage Borough at the Britannia Stadium. However Glennon departed Brunton Park in June 2005 after declaring the contract he was offered was 'unacceptably low'.

Falkirk & St Johnstone
He went to Scotland to join SPL club Falkirk in July 2005 after saying he had been "bowled over by the quality of the stadium and training facilities". He featured 23 times in the first half of the 2005–06 season before he decided to leave the club after being dropped for Allan Ferguson by manager John Hughes. He moved on to Scottish First Division side St Johnstone in January 2006 after manager Owen Coyle released back-up goalkeeper Mark Paston. At St Johnstone he scored his only senior goal, as a desperate last-minute attempt to equalise paid off in a 2–2 draw at Ross County on 11 March. Coyle offered Glennon a contract to stay at McDiarmid Park, but he instead chose to return south of the border to sign with Peter Jackson's Huddersfield Town in June 2006.

Huddersfield Town
After moving to the Galpharm Stadium, Glennon firmly established himself as the club's first choice keeper. He achieved a rare feat in saving three penalty kicks – two penalties were awarded, but one had to be retaken – in the same game against Crewe Alexandra on 24 February 2007, even though Town still lost the game 2–1. His perfect appearance record at Town was tarnished after he was sent off in Town's 4–1 defeat by Southend United at Roots Hall on 5 December 2007, forcing 17-year-old Alex Smithies to come on in his place. Manager Andy Ritchie said that he would appeal the red card after striker Leon Clarke admitted that he had slipped rather than been fouled by Glennon. In May 2008, he signed a two-year extension to his contract with Huddersfield Town after manager Stan Ternent declared him to be "an integral part of the squad". However, he did not featured under new manager Lee Clark, who took charge in December 2008 and kept faith in teenager Alex Smithies, and Glennon had his contract terminated in January 2010.

Bradford City
He then joined League Two side Bradford City on a deal until the end of the 2009–10 season after manager Stuart McCall needed a replacement for departed loanee goalkeeper Simon Eastwood. Glennon departed Valley Parade after he was released in May 2010.

Stockport County
In September 2010, Glennon joined his hometown club Stockport County on a permanent deal. He replaced Owain Fôn Williams as the club's first choice stopper, and started 36 league games in 2010–11 as the "Hatters" were relegated out of the Football League. Glennon made a further 26 appearances in 2011–12, but was released by manager Jim Gannon on 31 January 2012.

Non-league
On 24 February 2012, Glennon signed for Chester of the Northern Premier League Premier Division until the end of the season, keeping a clean sheet on his debut against Buxton. He helped the club to win the league title and promotion to the Conference in 2011–12, before leaving the Deva Stadium in the summer.

He signed with FC Halifax Town, another reformed club, in July 2012, with the intention of battling Phil Senior for the first team spot. He played 51 matches in the 2012–13 campaign, and kept a clean sheet in the Conference North play-off final, as promotion was secured with a 1–0 victory over Brackley Town. He was an unused substitute in the West Riding County Cup victory over Guiseley.

He missed just one league game in the 2013–14 season as he helped the club to secure a play-off spot, where they were beaten by Cambridge United at the semi-final stage. He was an ever-present throughout the 2014–15 league campaign, as Halifax posted a ninth-place finish, and signed a new contract in the summer. Halifax were relegated at the end of the 2015–16 season, and Glennon spent the second half of the season as back-up goalkeeper to loan signing Sam Johnson. He joined Buxton on loan in January 2016. He announced his retirement after he was released by Halifax. However, he played once for Scarborough Athletic after being coaxed out of retirement by manager Steve Kittrick. He again came out of retirement in February 2017, to play one game for AFC Emley in a Northern Counties East League Division One against Brigg Town after regular goalkeeper Graham McLachlan picked up a suspension.

International career
Glennon represented England at semi-professional level making two appearances for the England C team during his time at Carlisle United in 2005 when they were playing in the Conference National.

Personal life
In 2012, Glennon and wife Nicola opened two Hair & Beauty Lounges in Emley, Huddersfield, both named G27 in reference to his playing career.

Career statistics

Honours
Carlisle United
Football League Trophy runner-up: 2003
Conference National play-offs: 2004–05

Chester
Northern Premier League Premier Division: 2011–12

FC Halifax Town
Conference North play-offs: 2012–13
West Riding County Cup: 2012–13

References

Living people
1978 births
Footballers from Stockport
English footballers
England semi-pro international footballers
Association football goalkeepers
Bolton Wanderers F.C. players
Port Vale F.C. players
Stockport County F.C. players
Bristol Rovers F.C. players
Carlisle United F.C. players
Hull City A.F.C. players
Falkirk F.C. players
St Johnstone F.C. players
Huddersfield Town A.F.C. players
Bradford City A.F.C. players
Chester F.C. players
FC Halifax Town players
Buxton F.C. players
Scarborough Athletic F.C. players
Emley A.F.C. players
English Football League players
National League (English football) players
Northern Premier League players
Scottish Premier League players
Scottish Football League players
Northern Counties East Football League players